Scissurella manawatawhia is a species of minute sea snail, a marine gastropod mollusc in the family Scissurellidae.

Description
The minute, thin, white shell grows to a height of 1 mm.

Distribution
This marine species occurs off New Zealand

References

 Powell A. W. B., New Zealand Mollusca, William Collins Publishers Ltd, Auckland, New Zealand 1979 
 A.W.B. Powell,  New species of marine mollusca from New Zealand, Discovery Report, National Institute of Oceanography of Great Britain, v. 15, 1937
 Geiger D.L. (2012) Monograph of the little slit shells. Volume 1. Introduction, Scissurellidae. pp. 1-728. Volume 2. Anatomidae, Larocheidae, Depressizonidae, Sutilizonidae, Temnocinclidae. pp. 729–1291. Santa Barbara Museum of Natural History Monographs Number 7.

Scissurellidae
Gastropods of New Zealand
Gastropods described in 1937